Konrad Nowak may refer to:
 Konrad Nowak (footballer, born 1985), Polish football player
 Konrad Nowak (footballer, born 1994), Polish football player